Farid Villaume (born February 10, 1975), is a French Muay Thai kickboxer, having won world titles in different boxes fists feet.

Biography and career

Biography 
Farid Villaume is a boxer who has adapted remarkably well to the style Muaythai which is not the case for many European nakmuay who often have a style of boxing for the fists. His boxing is fine and precise, it is well known for placing his shots rather than being a puncher. It can be considered as one of the best French stylists, an example in terms of technics. He is particularly fond of boxing with elbows.

He is the most talented Muaythai fighter the country has produced since the legendary Dany Bill.

Farid had the privilege to train as a child with Thai instructors such as Lom Isarn, Lamkong or Soudareth. This is probably why Villaume is one of the few foreigners to fight exactly like a Thai.

Villaume stands at 1m80 for 72 kg. Father of Corsican and Moroccan mother, he has been training Muaythai since the age of 16.

Early career 
It counts more than 50 fights, 10 defeats and 2 draws. Farid Villaume fought in Muaythai and Kickboxing.

After two years out of the ring, Villaume returned to face Antuan Siangboxing at Best of Siam 2 in Paris on November 22, 2012 only to lose on points.

Titles and achievements

Titles 
 2009 WAKO Pro World Muaythai Champion
 2009 WFKB World Muaythai Champion
 2006 A1 World Combat Cup Champion
 2004 WMC World Muaythai Champion
 2004 EMF European Muaythai Champion
 2003 S1 World Muaythai Championship Runner Up
 2003 MTA World Muaythai Champion
 2001 WMTC World Muaythai Champion
 1998 IFMA World Amateur Muaythai Champion
 1998 French Muaythai Champion
 1997 French Muaythai Champion

Fight record 

|-  bgcolor="#FFBBBB"
| 2012-11-22 || Loss ||align=left| Antuan Siangboxing || Best of Siam 2 || Paris, France || Decision || 5 || 3:00
|-
|-  style="background:#CCFFCC"
| 2010-10-15 || Win ||align=left| Moussa Konaté || Maxi Fight 2 || Stade de l'Est, Réunion || Decision || 5 || 3:00
|-
|-  bgcolor="#FFBBBB"
| 2010-02-26 || Loss ||align=left| Saiyok Pumpanmuang || Lumpinee Stadium || Bangkok, Thailand || Decision (Unanimous) || 5 || 3:00
|-
! style=background:white colspan=9 |
|-
|-  bgcolor="#FFBBBB"
| 2009-11-14 || Loss ||align=left| Abdallah Mabel || La Nuit des Champions 2009 || Marseille, France || Decision || 5 || 3:00
|-
! style=background:white colspan=9 |
|-
|-  bgcolor="#CCFFCC"
| 2009-07-11 || Win ||align=left| Fabio Siciliani || Diamond Fight World Tour 2 || Marrakech, Morocco || TKO (Referee Stoppage) ||  || 
|-
! style=background:white colspan=9 |
|-
|-  bgcolor="#CCFFCC"
| 2009-06-20 || Win ||align=left| Johann Fauveau || Gala de Levallois || Levallois-Perret, France || Decision || 5 || 3:00
|-
|-  bgcolor="#CCFFCC"
| 2009-05-16 || Win ||align=left| Ali Gunyar || Légendes et Guerriers || Toulouse, France || Forfeit ||  || 
|-
! style=background:white colspan=9 |
|-
|-  bgcolor="#CCFFCC"
| 2009-01-17 || Win ||align=left| Sayfa Sitpordam || Muaythai in Hall Rhénus || Strasbourg, France || TKO (Throw in the towel) || 2 || 
|-
|-  bgcolor="#FFBBBB"
| 2008-12-20 || Loss ||align=left| Lamsongkram Chuwattana || Boxe-Thai Guinea Tournament, Semi Final || Malabo, Equatorial Guinea || Decision (Unanimous) || 3 || 3:00
|-
|-  bgcolor="#CCFFCC"
| 2008-12-20 || Win ||align=left| Mbanda || Boxe-Thai Guinea Tournament, Quarter Final || Malabo, Equatorial Guinea || TKO (Referee Stoppage) || 1 || 
|-
|-  bgcolor="#CCFFCC"
| 2008-11-06 || Win ||align=left| Kapapeth || Muaythai in Levallois || Levallois-Perret, France || TKO (Referee Stoppage) || 1 || 
|-
|-  bgcolor="#FFBBBB"
| 2008-06-20 || Loss ||align=left| Lamsongkram Chuwattana || International Muay Thai Fight Night || Montego Bay, Jamaica || Decision || 5 || 3:00
|-
! style=background:white colspan=9 |
|-
|-  bgcolor="#FFBBBB"
| 2008-03-02 || Loss ||align=left| Ali Gunyar || SLAMM "Nederland vs Thailand IV" || Almere, Netherlands || Decision || 5 || 3:00
|-
|-  bgcolor="#FFBBBB"
| 2007-11-29 || Loss ||align=left| Yodsanklai Fairtex || France vs Thailand || Paris, France || TKO (Referee stoppage) || 3 ||
|-
|-  bgcolor="#CCFFCC"
| 2007-06-28 || Win ||align=left| Nonthanun Por. Pramuk || K-1 World MAX 2007 World Tournament Final Elimination || Tokyo, Japan || Decision (Unanimous) || 3 || 3:00
|-
|-  bgcolor="#CCFFCC"
| 2007-06-16 || Win ||align=left| Samkor Kiatmontep || The Night of the Superfights VIII || Paris, France || TKO (Referee Stoppage) || 4 || 
|-
|-  bgcolor="#c5d2ea"
| 2007-05-30 || Draw ||align=left| Yodsanklai Fairtex || France vs Thailand || Paris, France || Decision draw || 5 || 3:00
|-
|-  bgcolor="#CCFFCC"
| 2006-12-17 || Win ||align=left| Yohan Lidon || A-1 World Combat Cup, Final || Turkey || Decision || 5 || 3:00
|-
! style=background:white colspan=9 |
|-
|-  bgcolor="#CCFFCC"
| 2006-10-21 || Win ||align=left| Abdallah Mabel || A-1 World Combat Cup, Semi Final || Istanbul, Turkey || KO || 2 || 
|-
|-  bgcolor="#CCFFCC"
| 2006-10-17 || Win ||align=left| José Reis || A-1 World Combat Cup, Quarter Final || Istanbul, Turkey || Decision || 5 || 3:00 
|-
|-  bgcolor="#CCFFCC"
| 2006-09-09 || Win ||align=left| Fabrice Acosta || A-1 World Combat Cup, Final 8 || Antalya, Turkey || TKO (Knee) ||  ||  
|-
|-  bgcolor="#CCFFCC"
| 2006-04-08 || Win ||align=left| Jan Van Denderen || The Night of the Superfights IV || Paris, France || TKO (Corner Stoppage) ||  || 
|-
|-  bgcolor="#CCFFCC"
| 2006-01-14 || Win ||align=left| Ole Laursen || The Night of the Superfights III || Villebon-sur-Yvette, France || KO || 2 || 
|-
|-  bgcolor="#CCFFCC"
| 2005-05-28 || Win ||align=left| Ryuji Goto || World Championship in Aubagne || Aubagne, France || Decision (Unanimous) || 5 || 3:00
|-
! style=background:white colspan=9 |
|-
|-  bgcolor="#CCFFCC"
| 2005-02-23 || Win ||align=left| Toshiyuki Kinami || K-1 World MAX 2005 Japan Tournament || Tokyo, Japan || Ext R. Decision (Unanimous) || 4 || 3:00
|-
|-  bgcolor="#CCFFCC"
| 2004-11-27 || Win ||align=left| Wanlop Sitpholek || World Championship in Woippy || Woippy, France || Decision (Unanimous) || 5 || 3:00
|-
! style=background:white colspan=9 |
|-
|-  bgcolor="#CCFFCC"
| 2004-09-25 || Win ||align=left| Sofiane Allouache || Gala in Le Zénith || Paris, France || TKO (2 Knockdowns) || 1 || 
|-
|-  bgcolor="#CCFFCC"
| 2004-04-24 || Win ||align=left| Baker Barakat || European Muaythai Championship, Final || Woippy, France || TKO (2 Knockdowns) || 2 || 
|-
! style=background:white colspan=9 |
|-
|-  bgcolor="#CCFFCC"
| 2004-03-06 || Win ||align=left| Youssef Akhnik || European Muaythai Championship, 3rd Round || Woippy, France || TKO (Referee Stoppage) || 3 || 
|-
|-  bgcolor="#FFBBBB"
| 2003-12-05 || Loss ||align=left| Suriya Prasathinphimai || King's Birthday : S1 World Championships, Final || Sanam Luang, Thailand || Decision || 3 || 3:00 
|-
! style=background:white colspan=9 |
|-
|-  bgcolor="#CCFFCC"
| 2003-12-05 || Win ||align=left| Munkong Kiatsomkuan || King's Birthday : S1 World Championships, Semi Final || Sanam Luang, Thailand || KO (Left Cross) || 3 || 
|-
|-  bgcolor="#CCFFCC"
| 2003-12-05 || Win ||align=left| Nuengtrakan Por Muang-Ubon || King's Birthday : S1 World Championships, Quarter Final || Sanam Luang, Thailand || KO (Left Cross) || 3 || 
|-
|-  bgcolor="#CCFFCC"
| 2003-11-08 || Win ||align=left| Sakmongkol Sithchuchok || Muaythai Gala in Trieste || Trieste, Italy || Decision (Unanimous) || 5 || 3:00 
|-
! style=background:white colspan=9 |
|-
|-  bgcolor="#CCFFCC"
| 2003-00-00 || Win ||align=left| Baker Barakat || European Muaythai Championship, 2nd Round || Aubagne, France || KO || 3 ||  
|-
|-  bgcolor="#CCFFCC"
| 2003-03-29 || Win ||align=left| Joao Diago || European Muaythai Championship, 1st Round || Paris, France || Decision || 3 || 3:00 
|-
|-  bgcolor="#CCFFCC"
| 2002-08-19 || Win ||align=left| Orono Por Muang Ubon || Queen's Birthday event || Sukhothai Province, Thailand || Decision || 5 || 3:00 
|-
! style=background:white colspan=9 |
|-  bgcolor="#CCFFCC"
| 2002-06-08 || Win ||align=left| Saimai Chor Suananun || Titans du 3ème Millénaire || Lyon, France || KO || 3 ||  
|-
|-  bgcolor="#CCFFCC"
| 2002-04-08 || Win ||align=left| Taweesab Sitsaengorun || Muaythai Event in Thailand || Thailand || KO || 3 ||  
|-
|-  bgcolor="#CCFFCC"
| 2002-02-16 || Win ||align=left| Mangonjuk || Muaythai Gala in Salle Japy || Paris, France || TKO || 3 ||  
|-
|-  bgcolor="#CCFFCC"
| 2002-02-03 || Win ||align=left| Sakhetdao K.T. Gym || Muaythai Gala in Salle Japy || Paris, France || KO (Highkick) || 2 ||  
|-
|-  bgcolor="#CCFFCC"
| 2001-00-00 || Win ||align=left| Sittichok Lukprabaht || Muaythai Gala ||  || KO ||  ||  
|-
|-  bgcolor="#CCFFCC"
| 2001-00-00 || Win ||align=left| Vihoknoi Sit Theppituk || Muaythai Gala ||  || KO ||  ||  
|-
|-  bgcolor="#CCFFCC"
| 2001-00-00 || Win ||align=left| Ridouan El Assrouti || Muaythai Gala ||  || KO ||  ||  
|-
|-
| colspan=9 | Legend:

See also 
 List of male kickboxers

References

External links 
 Farid Villaume Interview
 Farid Villaume Profile

1975 births
Living people
French male kickboxers
French Muay Thai practitioners
French sportspeople of Moroccan descent